The Griffith, later Waldie-Griffith Baronetcy, of Munster Grillagh in the County of Londonderry and of Pencraig in the County of Anglesey, was a title in the Baronetage of the United Kingdom. It was created on 20 April 1858 for the Irish geologist and mining engineer Richard Griffith. The second Baronet assumed the additional surname of Waldie, which was that of his maternal grandfather. The title became extinct on the death of the third Baronet in 1933.

Griffith, later Waldie-Griffith baronets, of Munster Grillagh and Pencraig (1858)
Sir Richard John Griffith, 1st Baronet (1784–1878)
Sir George Richard Waldie-Griffith, 2nd Baronet (1820–1889)
Sir Richard John Waldie-Griffith, 3rd Baronet (1850–1933)

References

Extinct baronetcies in the Baronetage of the United Kingdom